The Doolittle Raid, also known as the Tokyo Raid, was an air raid on 18 April 1942 by the United States on the Japanese capital Tokyo and other places on Honshu during World War II. It was the first American air operation to strike the Japanese archipelago. Although the raid caused comparatively minor damage, it demonstrated that the Japanese mainland was vulnerable to American air attacks. It served as an initial retaliation for the 7 December 1941 attack on Pearl Harbor, and provided an important boost to American morale. The raid was planned by, led by, and named after Lieutenant Colonel James Doolittle.

Under the final plan, 16 B-25B Mitchell medium bombers, each with a crew of five, were launched from the US Navy aircraft carrier , in the Pacific Ocean. There were no fighter escorts. After bombing the military and industrial targets, the crews were to continue westward to land in China.

On the ground, the raid killed about 50 people and injured 400. Damage to Japanese military and industrial targets was slight, but the raid had major psychological effects. In the United States, it raised morale. In Japan, it raised fear and doubt about the ability of military leaders to defend the home islands, but the bombing and strafing of civilians created a desire for retribution – this was exploited for propaganda purposes. The raid also pushed forward Admiral Isoroku Yamamoto's plans to attack Midway Island in the Central Pacific – an attack that turned into a decisive defeat of the Imperial Japanese Navy (IJN) by the US Navy in the Battle of Midway. The consequences of the Doolittle Raid were most severely felt in China: in reprisal for the raid, the Japanese launched the Zhejiang-Jiangxi campaign, killing 250,000 civilians and 70,000 soldiers.

Of the 16 crews involved, 14 returned to the United States or reached the safety of American forces, though one man was killed while bailing out. Eight men were captured by Japanese forces in eastern China (the other two crew members having drowned in the sea), and three of these were later executed. All but one of the B-25s were destroyed in crashes, while the 16th landed at Vladivostok in the Soviet Union.

Because the Soviet Union was not officially at war with Japan, it was required, under international law, to intern the crew during the war, and their B-25 was confiscated. However, within a year, the crew was secretly allowed to leave the Soviet Union, under the guise of an escape – they returned to the United States or to American units elsewhere by way of Allied-occupied Iran and North Africa.

Doolittle initially believed that the loss of  his aircraft would lead to his court-martial – instead he received the Medal of Honor and was promoted two ranks to brigadier general.

Background

President Franklin D. Roosevelt spoke to the Joint Chiefs of Staff in a meeting at the White House on 21 December 1941 and said that Japan should be bombed as soon as possible to boost public morale after Pearl Harbor. Doolittle recounted in his autobiography that the raid was intended to bolster American morale and to cause the Japanese to begin doubting their leadership: "An attack on the Japanese homeland would cause confusion in the minds of the Japanese people and sow doubt about the reliability of their leaders. ... Americans badly needed a morale boost."

The concept for the attack came from Navy Captain Francis S. Low, Assistant Chief of Staff for antisubmarine warfare. He reported to Admiral Ernest J. King on 10 January 1942 that he thought that twin-engined Army bombers could be launched from an aircraft carrier, after observing several at Naval Station Norfolk Chambers Field in Norfolk, where the runway was painted with the outline of a carrier deck for landing practice. Doolittle, a famous military test pilot, civilian aviator, and  aeronautical engineer before the war, was assigned to Army Air Forces Headquarters to plan the raid. The range of the Mitchell was about 1,300 miles, so the bombers had to be modified to hold nearly twice the normal fuel reserves. Doolittle also considered the Martin B-26 Marauder, Douglas B-18 Bolo, and Douglas B-23 Dragon, but the B-26 had questionable takeoff characteristics from a carrier deck and the B-23's wingspan was nearly 50-percent greater than the B-25's, reducing the number that could be taken aboard a carrier and posing risks to the ship's superstructure. The B-18 was one of the final two types that Doolittle considered, and he rejected it for the same reason. The B-25 had yet to see combat, but tests indicated that it could fulfill the mission's requirements.

Negotiations with the Soviet Union were fruitless for permission to land because it had signed a neutrality pact with Japan in April 1941. China's Chiang Kai-shek agreed to the landing sites in China despite the concern of Japanese reprisals. Five possible airfields were selected. These sites would serve as refueling stops, allowing the crews to fly to Chungking. Bombers attacking defended targets often relied on a fighter escort to defend them from enemy fighters, but accompanying fighters were not possible.

Preparation

When planning indicated that the B-25 was the aircraft that best met all of the requirements of the mission, two were loaded aboard the aircraft carrier  at Norfolk, Virginia, and were flown off the deck without difficulty on 3 February 1942. The raid was immediately approved and the 17th Bombardment Group (Medium) was chosen to provide the pool of crews from which volunteers would be recruited. The 17th BG had been the first group to receive B-25s, with all four of its squadrons equipped with the bomber by September 1941. The 17th not only was the first medium bomb group of the Army Air Corps, but in early 1942, also had the most experienced B-25 crews. Its first assignment following the entry of the United States into the war was to the U.S. Eighth Air Force.

The 17th BG, then flying antisubmarine patrols from Pendleton, Oregon, was immediately moved cross-country to Columbia Army Air Base at West Columbia, South Carolina, ostensibly to fly similar patrols off the East Coast of the United States, but in actuality to prepare for the mission against Japan. The group officially transferred effective 9 February 1942 to Columbia, where its combat crews were offered the opportunity to volunteer for an "extremely hazardous", but unspecified mission. On 19 February, the group was detached from the Eighth Air Force and officially assigned to III Bomber Command.

Initial planning called for 20 aircraft to fly the mission, and 24 of the group's B-25B Mitchell bombers were diverted to the Mid-Continent Airlines modification center in Minneapolis, Minnesota. With support provided by two senior airline managers, Wold-Chamberlain Field's maintenance hangar was the first modification center to become operational. From nearby Fort Snelling, the 710th Military Police Battalion provided tight security around this hangar. B-25B aircraft modifications included the following:
 Removal of the lower gun turret.
 Installation of de-icers and anti-icers.
 Mounting of steel blast plates on the fuselage around the upper turret.
 Removal of the liaison radio set to save weight.
 Installation of a 160-gallon collapsible neoprene auxiliary fuel tank, fixed to the top of the bomb bay, and installation of support mounts for additional fuel cells in the bomb bay, crawlway, and lower turret area, to increase fuel capacity from 646 to 1,141 U.S. gallons (538 to 950 imperial gallons, or 2,445 to 4,319 L).
 Installation of mock gun barrels (broomsticks) in the tail cone.
 Replacement of the Norden bombsight with a makeshift aiming sight devised by pilot Capt. C. Ross Greening that was dubbed the "Mark Twain". The materials for this bombsight cost only 20 cents.

Two bombers also had cameras mounted to record the results of the bombing.

The 24 crews were selected and picked up the modified bombers in Minneapolis and flew them to Eglin Field, Florida, beginning 1 March 1942. There, the crews received concentrated training for three weeks in simulated carrier deck takeoffs, low-level and night flying, low-altitude bombing, and over-water navigation, operating primarily out of Eglin Auxiliary Field#1, a more secluded site. Lieutenant Henry L. Miller, a U.S. Navy flight instructor from nearby Naval Air Station Pensacola, supervised their takeoff training and accompanied the crews to the launch. For his efforts, Miller is considered an honorary member of the Raider group.

Doolittle stated in his after-action report that the crews reached a "safely operational" level of training, despite several days when flying was not possible because of rain and fog. One aircraft was written off in a landing accident on 10 March and another was heavily damaged in a takeoff accident on 23 March, while a third was removed from the mission because of a nose wheel shimmy that could not be repaired in time.

On 25 March 1942, the remaining 22 B-25s took off from Eglin for McClellan Field, California. They arrived two days later at the Sacramento Air Depot for inspection and final modifications. A total of 16 B-25s were flown to NAS Alameda, California on 31 March. Fifteen made up the mission force and the 16th, by last-minute agreement with the Navy, was loaded so that it could be launched shortly after departure from San Francisco to demonstrate to the Army pilots that there was sufficient deck space for a safe takeoff. Instead, that bomber was made part of the mission force.

Participating aircraft

In order of launching, the 16 aircraft were:

Mission 

On 1 April 1942, the 16 modified bombers, their five-man crews, and Army maintenance personnel, totaling 71 officers and 130 enlisted men, were loaded onto Hornet at Naval Air Station Alameda in California. Each aircraft carried four specially constructed 500-pound (225 kg) bombs. Three of these were high-explosive munitions and one was a bundle of incendiaries. The incendiaries were long tubes, wrapped together to be carried in the bomb bay, but designed to separate and scatter over a wide area after release. Five bombs had Japanese "friendship" medals wired to them—medals awarded by the Japanese government to U.S. servicemen before the war.

The bombers' armament was reduced to increase range by decreasing weight. Each bomber launched with two .50-caliber (12.7 mm) machine guns in an upper turret and a .30-caliber (7.62 mm) machine gun in the nose. The aircraft were clustered closely and tied down on Hornets flight deck in the order of launch.

Hornet and Task Force 18 got underway from San Francisco Bay at 08:48 on 2 April with the 16 bombers in clear view. At noon the next day, parts to complete modifications that had not been finished at McClellan were lowered to the forward deck of Hornet by Navy blimp L-8. A few days later, the carrier met with Task Force 16, commanded by Vice Admiral William F. Halsey, Jr.—the carrier  and her escort of cruisers and destroyers in the mid-Pacific Ocean north of Hawaii. Enterprises fighters and scout planes provided protection for the entire task force in the event of a Japanese air attack, since Hornets fighters were stowed below decks to allow the B-25s to use the flight deck.

The combined force was two carriers (Hornet and Enterprise), three heavy cruisers, one light cruiser, eight destroyers, and two fleet oilers ( and ). The ships proceeded in radio silence. On the afternoon of 17 April, the slow oilers refueled the task force, then withdrew with the destroyers to the east while the carriers and cruisers dashed west at  toward their intended launch point in enemy-controlled waters east of Japan.

The chief petty officer who captained the boat killed himself rather than be captured, but five of the 11 crew were picked up by Nashville.

Doolittle and Hornet skipper Captain Marc Mitscher decided to launch the B-25s immediately—10 hours early and  farther from Japan than planned. After respotting to allow for engine start and runups, Doolittle's aircraft had  of takeoff distance. Although none of the B-25 pilots, including Doolittle, had ever taken off from a carrier before, all 16 aircraft launched safely between 08:20 and 09:19, though Doolittle's bomber was witnessed to have almost hit the water before pulling up at the last second. The B-25s then flew toward Japan, most in groups of two to four aircraft, before flying singly at wave-top level to avoid detection.

Although some B-25s encountered light antiaircraft fire and a few enemy fighters (made up of Ki-45s and prototype Ki-61s, the latter being mistaken for Bf 109s) over Japan, no bomber was shot down. Only the B-25 of 1st Lt. Richard O. Joyce received any battle damage, minor hits from antiaircraft fire. B-25 No. 4, piloted by 1st Lt. Everett W. Holstrom, jettisoned its bombs before reaching its target when it came under attack by fighters after its gun turret malfunctioned.

The Americans claimed to have shot down three Japanese fighters – one by the gunners of the Whirling Dervish, piloted by 1st Lt. Harold Watson, and two by the gunners of the Hari Kari-er, piloted by 1st Lt. Ross Greening. Many targets were strafed by the bombers' nose gunners. The subterfuge of the simulated gun barrels mounted in the tail cones was described afterwards by Doolittle as effective, in that no airplane was attacked directly from behind.

Fifteen of the 16 aircraft then proceeded southwest off the southeastern coast of Japan and across the East China Sea toward eastern China. One B-25, piloted by Captain Edward J. York, was extremely low on fuel, and headed instead for the Soviet Union rather than be forced to ditch in the middle of the East China Sea. Several fields in Zhejiang province were supposed to be ready to guide them in using homing beacons, then recover and refuel them for continuing on to Chongqing, the wartime Kuomintang capital. The primary base was at Zhuzhou, toward which all the aircraft navigated, but Halsey never sent the planned signal to alert them, apparently because of a possible threat to the task force.

The raiders faced several unforeseen challenges during their flight to China: night was approaching, the aircraft were running low on fuel, and the weather was rapidly deteriorating. The crews realized they would probably not be able to reach their intended bases in China, leaving them the option of either bailing out over eastern China or crash-landing along the Chinese coast.

All 15 aircraft reached the Chinese coast after 13 hours of flight and crash-landed or the crews bailed out. One crewman, 20-year-old Corporal Leland D. Faktor, flight engineer/gunner with 1st Lt. Robert M. Gray, was killed during his bailout attempt over China, the only man in that crew to be lost. Two crews (10 men) were missing.

The 16th aircraft, commanded by Capt. Edward York (eighth off—AC #40-2242) flew to the Soviet Union and landed  beyond Vladivostok at Vozdvizhenka. As the USSR was not at war with Japan, and a Soviet-Japanese neutrality pact was officially in force, the Soviet government was officially unable to immediately repatriate any Allied personnel involved in hostilities, who entered Soviet territory. Furthermore,  at the time, the Soviet Far East was vulnerable to military action by Japanese forces. Consequently, in accordance with international law, the crew members were interned, despite official US requests for their release, and the B-25 was impounded. York would later report that he and his crew had been treated well by the Soviet authorities. Several months later, they were relocated to Ashgabat (Ashkhabad), in what was then the Turkmen Soviet Socialist Republic,  from the Soviet-Iranian border. In mid-1943, they were allowed to cross the border into Allied-occupied Iran. The Americans presented themselves to a British consulate on 11 May 1943. A cover story was concocted that York had bribed a smuggler to assist them in escaping from Soviet custody. The fact that the "smuggling" had been staged by the NKVD was later confirmed by declassified Soviet archives.

Doolittle and his crew, after parachuting into China, received assistance from Chinese soldiers and civilians, as well as John Birch, an American missionary in China. As did the others who participated in the mission, Doolittle had to bail out, but he landed in a heap of dung (saving a previously injured ankle from breaking) in a paddy in China near Quzhou.

Aftermath

Fate of the missing crewmen

Following the Doolittle Raid, most of the B-25 crews who had reached China eventually achieved safety with the help of Chinese civilians and soldiers.
Of the 16 planes and 80 airmen who participated in the raid, all either crash-landed, were ditched, or crashed after their crews bailed out, with the single exception of Capt. York and his crew, who landed in the Soviet Union. Despite the loss of these 15 aircraft, 69 airmen escaped capture or death, with only three killed in action. When the Chinese helped the Americans escape, the grateful Americans, in turn, gave them whatever they had on hand. The people who helped them paid dearly for sheltering the Americans. Eight Raiders were captured, but their fate was not fully known until 1946. Some of the men who crashed were aided by Patrick Cleary, the Irish Bishop of Nancheng. The Japanese troops retaliated by burning down the city.

The crews of two aircraft (10 men in total) were unaccounted for: those of 1st Lt. Dean E. Hallmark (sixth off) and 1st Lt. William G. Farrow (last off). On 15 August 1942, the United States learned from the Swiss Consulate General in Shanghai that eight of the missing crew members were prisoners of the Japanese at the city's police headquarters. Two of the missing crewmen, bombardier S/Sgt. William J. Dieter and flight engineer Sgt. Donald E. Fitzmaurice of Hallmark's crew, were found to have drowned when their B-25 crashed into the sea. Both of their remains were recovered after the war and were buried with military honors at Golden Gate National Cemetery.

The other eight were captured: 1st Lt. Dean E. Hallmark, 1st Lt. William G. Farrow, 1st Lt. Robert J. Meder, 1st Lt. Chase Nielsen, 1st Lt. Robert L. Hite, 2nd Lt. George Barr, Cpl. Harold A. Spatz, and Cpl. Jacob DeShazer. All eight captured in Jiangxi, tried and sentenced to death at a military trial in China, and then transported to Tokyo where the Army Ministry reviewed their case, with five of the sentences being commuted and the other three being executed (presumably also in Tokyo or nearby). Out of the 80 crewmen 3 died, 8 were captured (as seen here) and 3 were killed in captivity by the Japanese.

The surviving captured airmen remained in military confinement on a starvation diet, their health rapidly deteriorating. In April 1943, they were moved to Nanking, where Meder died on 1 December 1943. The remaining men — Nielsen, Hite, Barr and DeShazer — eventually began receiving slightly better treatment and were given a copy of the Bible and a few other books. They were freed by American troops in August 1945. Four Japanese officers were tried for war crimes against the captured Doolittle Raiders, found guilty, and sentenced to hard labor, three for five years and one for nine years. Barr had been near death when liberated and remained behind in China recuperating until October, by which time he had begun to experience severe emotional problems. Untreated after transfer to Letterman Army Hospital and a military hospital in Clinton, Iowa, Barr became suicidal and was held virtually incommunicado until November, when Doolittle's personal intervention resulted in treatment that led to his recovery. DeShazer graduated from Seattle Pacific University in 1948 and returned to Japan as a missionary, where he served for over 30 years.

When their remains were recovered after the war, Farrow, Hallmark, and Meder were buried with full military honors at Arlington National Cemetery. Spatz was buried with military honors at National Memorial Cemetery of the Pacific.

Total crew casualties: 3 KIA: 2 off the coast of China, 1 in China; 8 POW: 3 executed, 1 died in captivity, 4 repatriated. In addition, seven crew members (including all five members of Lawson's crew) received injuries serious enough to require medical treatment. Of the surviving prisoners, Barr died of heart failure in 1967, Nielsen in 2007, DeShazer on 15 March 2008, and the last, Hite, died 29 March 2015.

Service of the returning crewmen

Immediately following the raid, Doolittle told his crew that he believed the loss of all 16 aircraft, coupled with the relatively minor damage to targets, had rendered the attack a failure, and that he expected a court-martial upon his return to the United States. Instead, the raid bolstered American morale. Doolittle was promoted two grades to brigadier general on 28 April while still in China, skipping the rank of colonel, and was presented with the Medal of Honor by Roosevelt upon his return to the United States in June. When General Doolittle toured the growing Eglin Field facility in July 1942 with commanding officer Col. Grandison Gardner, the local paper of record (the Okaloosa News-Journal, Crestview, Florida), while reporting his presence, made no mention of his still-secret recent training at Eglin. He went on to command the Twelfth Air Force in North Africa, the Fifteenth Air Force in the Mediterranean, and the Eighth Air Force in England during the next three years.

All 80 Raiders were awarded the Distinguished Flying Cross, and those who were killed or wounded during the raid were awarded the Purple Heart. Every Doolittle Raider was also decorated by the Chinese government. In addition, Corporal David J. Thatcher (a flight engineer/gunner on Lawson's crew) and 1st Lt. Thomas R. White (flight surgeon/gunner with Smith) were awarded the Silver Star for helping the wounded crew members of Lt. Lawson's crew to evade Japanese troops in China. Finally, as Doolittle noted in his autobiography, he successfully insisted that all of the Raiders receive a promotion.

Twenty-eight of the crewmen remained in the China Burma India theater, including the entire crews of planes 4, 10, and 13, flying missions, most for more than a year; five were killed in action. Nineteen crew members flew combat missions in the Mediterranean theater after returning to the United States, four of whom were killed in action and four becoming prisoners of war. Nine crew members served in the European Theater of Operations; one was killed in action, and one, David M. "Davy" Jones, was shot down and became a POW in Stalag Luft III at Sagan, where he played a part in The Great Escape. Altogether, 12 of the survivors died in air crashes within 15 months of the raid. Two survivors were separated from the USAAF in 1944 due to the severity of their injuries.

The 17th Bomb Group, from which the Doolittle Raiders had been recruited, received replacement crews and transferred to Barksdale Army Air Field in June 1942, where it converted to Martin B-26 Marauder medium bombers. In November 1942, it deployed overseas to North Africa, where it operated in the Mediterranean Theater of Operations with the Twelfth Air Force for the remainder of the war.

Zhejiang-Jiangxi campaign

After the raid, the Japanese Imperial Army began the Zhejiang-Jiangxi campaign (also known as Operation Sei-go) to prevent these eastern coastal provinces of China from being used again for an attack on Japan and to take revenge on the Chinese people. "Like a swarm of locusts, they left behind nothing but destruction and chaos," eyewitness Father Wendelin Dunker wrote. The Japanese killed an estimated 10,000 Chinese civilians during their search for Doolittle's men. People who aided the airmen were tortured before they were killed. Father Dunker wrote of the destruction of the town of Ihwang: "They shot any man, woman, child, cow, hog, or just about anything that moved, They raped any woman from the ages of 10–65, and before burning the town they thoroughly looted it ... None of the humans shot were buried either ..." The Japanese entered Nancheng (Jiangxi), population 50,000 on June 11, "beginning a reign of terror so horrendous that missionaries would later dub it 'the Rape of Nancheng.' " evoking memories of the infamous Rape of Nanjing five years before. Less than a month later, the Japanese forces put what remained of the city to the torch. "This planned burning was carried on for three days," one Chinese newspaper reported, "and the city of Nancheng became charred earth."

When Japanese troops moved out of the Zhejiang and Jiangxi areas in mid-August, they left behind a trail of devastation. Chinese estimates put the civilian death toll at 250,000. The Imperial Japanese Army had also spread cholera, typhoid, plague infected fleas and dysentery pathogens. The Japanese biological warfare Unit 731 brought almost 300 pounds of paratyphoid and anthrax to be left in contaminated food and contaminated wells with the withdrawal of the army from areas around Yushan, Kinhwa and Futsin. Around 1,700 Japanese troops died out of a total 10,000 Japanese soldiers who fell ill with disease when their biological weapons attack rebounded on their own forces.

Shunroku Hata, the commander of Japanese forces involved in the massacre of the 250,000 Chinese civilians, was sentenced in 1948 in part due to his "failure to prevent atrocities". He was given a life sentence but was paroled in 1954.

Battle of the Coral Sea 

Admiral Nimitz attempted to commit Enterprise and Hornet to support USS Lexington and USS Yorktown against Japanese forces involved in Operation Mo. However, the close timing between the Doolittle Raid and the eventual Battle of the Coral Sea prevented Enterprise and Hornet from being able to take part in the battle in early May 1942.

Additional perspectives 
Doolittle recounted in his autobiography that at the time he thought the mission was a failure and he would be demoted upon return to the US.

This mission showed that a B-25 takeoff from a carrier was easier than previously thought, and night operations could be possible in the future. The Shuttle bombing (taking off and landing at different air bases) run was shown to be an effective carrier task force tactic since there was no need to wait for the returning aircraft.

The American pilots, instead of landing as planned, were forced to bail out due to a lack of ground lighting to provide guidance. Chinese airfield crews recounted that due to the unexpectedly early arrivals of the B-25s, homing beacon and runway torch lights were not on for fear of possible Japanese airstrikes as happened before. If Claire Lee Chennault had been informed of the mission specifics, the outcome might have been very much better for the Americans: Chennault had built an effective air surveillance net in China that would have been able to provide updated arrival information about the raiders to the airfield crews, and could have confirmed that there was no risk of Japanese airstrikes, allowing the landing lights to be lit at the time necessary to allow safe landings.

Chiang Kai-Shek awarded the raiders China's highest military decorations, and predicted (in his diary) that Japan would alter its goals and strategy as a result of the disgrace. Indeed, the raid was a shock to staff at Japanese Imperial General Headquarters. As a direct consequence, Japan attacked territories in China to prevent similar shuttle bombing runs. High command withdrew substantial air force resources from supporting offensive operations in order to defend the home islands. The Aleutian Islands campaign was launched to prevent the US from using the islands as bomber bases to attack Japan -- this required two carriers that otherwise would have been used for the Battle of Midway. Thus, the raid's most significant strategic accomplishment was that it compelled the Japanese high command into ordering a very inefficient disposition of their forces, and poor decision-making due to fear of attack, for the rest of the war.

Mitsuo Fuchida and Shigeyoshi Miwa considered the "one-way" raid "excellent strategy", with the bombers evading Army fighters by flying "much lower than anticipated". Kuroshima said the raid "passed like a shiver over Japan" and Miwa criticised the Army for claiming to have shot down nine aircraft rather than "not even one".

Effect 

Compared with the future devastating Boeing B-29 Superfortress attacks against Japan, the Doolittle raid did little material damage, and all of it was easily repaired. Preliminary reports stated 12 were killed and more than 100 were wounded. Eight primary and five secondary targets were struck. In Tokyo, the targets included an oil tank farm, a steel mill, and several power plants. In Yokosuka, at least one bomb from the B-25 piloted by 1st Lt. Edgar E. McElroy struck the nearly completed light carrier , delaying her launch until November. Six schools and an army hospital were also hit. Japanese officials reported the two aircraft whose crews were captured had struck their targets.

Allied ambassadors and staff in Tokyo were still interned until agreement was reached about their repatriation via the neutral port of Lourenço Marques in Portuguese East Africa in June–July 1942. When Joseph Grew (US) realized the low-flying planes overhead were American (not Japanese planes on maneuvers) he thought they may have flown from the Aleutian Islands. The Japanese press claimed that nine had been shot down, but there were no pictures of crashed planes. Embassy staff were "very happy and proud" and the British said that they "drank toasts all day to the American flyers". Sir Robert Craigie, GCMG, the interned British Ambassador to Japan who was under house arrest in Tokyo at the time, said that Japanese staff had been amused at the embassy's air raid precautions as the idea of an attack on Tokyo was "laughable" with the Allies in retreat, but the guards now showed "considerable excitement and perturbation." Several false alarms followed, and in poorer districts people rushed into the streets shouting and gesticulating, losing their normal "iron control" over their emotions and showing a "tendency to panic". The police guards on Allied and neutral missions were doubled to foil reprisal attacks; and the guard on the German mission was tripled.

Despite the minimal damage inflicted, American morale, still reeling from the attack on Pearl Harbor and Japan's subsequent territorial gains, soared when news of the raid was released. The Japanese press was told to describe the attack as a cruel, indiscriminate bombing against civilians, including women and children. After the war, the casualty count was 87 dead, 151 serious injuries, and more than 311 minor injuries; children were among those killed, and newspapers asked their parents to share their opinion on how the captured raiders should be treated.

The Japanese Navy attempted to locate and pursue the American task force. The Second Fleet, its main striking force, was near Formosa, returning from the Indian Ocean Raid to refit and replace its air losses. Spearheaded by five aircraft carriers and its best naval aircraft and aircrews, the Second Fleet was immediately ordered to locate and destroy the U.S. carrier force, but failed to do so, due to the American fleet choosing to head back to Hawaii (had they stayed after all, they would've found themselves attacked by the carriers Akagi, Sōryū and Hiryū). Nagumo and his staff on Akagi heard that an American force was near Japan but expected an attack on the next day. 

The Imperial Japanese Navy also bore a special responsibility for allowing an American aircraft carrier force to approach the Japanese Home Islands in a manner similar to the IJN fleet to Hawaii in 1941, and permitting it to escape undamaged. The fact that medium, normally land-based bombers carried out the attack confused the IJN's high command. This confusion and the knowledge that Japan was now vulnerable to air attack strengthened Yamamoto's resolve to destroy the American carrier fleet, which was not present in the Pearl Harbor Attack, resulting in a decisive Japanese defeat at the Battle of Midway.

After the raid the Americans were worried in April about the "still very badly undermanned west coast" and Chief of Staff George Marshall discussed a "possible attack by the Japanese upon our plants in San Diego and then a flight by those Japs down into Mexico after they have made their attack." So Secretary Stimson asked State to "touch base with their people south of the border", and Marshall flew to the West Coast on 22 May.

An unusual consequence of the raid came after when—in the interests of secrecy—President Roosevelt answered a reporter's question by saying that the raid had been launched from "Shangri-La", the fictional faraway land of the James Hilton novel Lost Horizon. The true details of the raid were revealed to the public one year later, in April 1943.

After the war 

The Doolittle Raiders held an annual reunion almost every year from the late 1940s to 2013. The high point of each reunion was a solemn, private ceremony in which the surviving Raiders performed a roll call, then toasted their fellow Raiders who had died during the previous year. Specially engraved silver goblets, one for each of the 80 Raiders, were used for this toast; the goblets of those who had died were inverted. Each Raider's name was engraved on his goblet both right side up and upside down. The Raiders drank a toast using a bottle of cognac that accompanied the goblets to each Raider reunion. In 2013, the remaining Raiders decided to hold their last public reunion at Fort Walton Beach, Florida, not far from Eglin Air Force Base, where they trained for the original mission. The bottle and the goblets had been maintained by the United States Air Force Academy on display in Arnold Hall, the cadet social center, until 2006. On 19 April 2006, these memorabilia were transferred to the National Museum of the United States Air Force at Wright-Patterson AFB, Ohio.

On 18 April 2013, a final reunion for the surviving Raiders was held at Eglin Air Force Base, with Robert Hite the only survivor unable to attend.

The "final toast to fallen comrades" by the surviving raiders took place at the NMUSAF on 9 November 2013, preceded by a B-25 flyover, and was attended by Richard Cole, Edward Saylor, and David Thatcher.

Seven other men, including Lt. Miller and raider historian Col. Carroll V. Glines, are considered honorary Raiders for their efforts for the mission.

The Children of the Doolittle Raiders organization was founded on 18 April 2006, authorized by the Doolittle Raiders organization and the surviving members at the time. Descendants of the Doolittle Raiders organize fundraisers for a scholarship fund and continue to organize the Doolittle Raiders reunions. The 2019 reunion was held at Lt. Col. Richard E. Cole's memorial service.

Last surviving airmen
Col. Bill Bower, the last surviving Doolittle raider aircraft commander, died on 10 January 2011 at age 93 in Boulder, Colorado.

Lt. Col. Edward Saylor, the then-enlisted engineer/gunner of aircraft No. 15 during the raid, died 28 January 2015 of natural causes at his home in Sumner, Washington, at the age of 94.

Lt. Col. Robert L. Hite, co-pilot of aircraft No. 16, died at a nursing home in Nashville, Tennessee, at the age of 95 on 29 March 2015. Hite was the last living prisoner of the Doolittle Raid.

S/Sgt. David J. Thatcher, gunner of aircraft No. 7, died on 22 June 2016 in Missoula, Montana, at the age of 94.

Lt Col. Richard E. Cole, Doolittle's copilot in aircraft No. 1, was the last surviving Doolittle Raider and the only one to live to an older age than Doolittle, who died in 1993 at age 96. Cole died 9 April 2019, at the age of 103.

Doolittle Raiders exhibit

The most extensive display of Doolittle Raid memorabilia is at the National Museum of the United States Air Force (on Wright-Patterson Air Force Base) in Dayton, Ohio. The centerpiece is a like-new B-25, which is painted and marked as Doolittle's aircraft, 40-2344, (rebuilt by North American Aviation to B-25B configuration from an F-10D photo reconnaissance version of the B-25D). The bomber, which North American Aviation presented to the Raiders in 1958, rests on a reproduction of Hornets flight deck. Several authentically dressed mannequins surround the aircraft, including representations of Doolittle, Hornet Captain Marc Mitscher, and groups of Army and Navy men loading the bomber's bombs and ammunition. Also exhibited are the silver goblets used by the Raiders at each of their annual reunions, pieces of flight clothing and personal equipment, a parachute used by one of the Raiders in his bailout over China, and group photographs of all 16 crews, and other items.

The last B-25 to be retired from the U.S. Air Force inventory is displayed at the Air Force Armament Museum at Eglin AFB, also in the markings of Gen. Doolittle's aircraft.

A fragment of the wreckage of one of the aircraft, and the medals awarded to Doolittle, are on display at the Smithsonian National Air and Space Museum in Washington, DC.

The 2006 Pacific Aviation Museum Pearl Harbor on Ford Island, Oahu, Hawaii, also has a 1942 exhibit in which the centerpiece is a restored B-25 in the markings of The Ruptured Duck used on the Doolittle Raid.

The San Marcos, Texas, chapter of the Commemorative Air Force has in its museum the armor plate from the pilot seat of the B-25 Doolittle flew in the raid.

The interchange of Edmund Highway (South Carolina 302) and Interstate 26 nearest the former Columbia Army Air Base is designated the Doolittle Raiders Interchange.

In China, a memorial hall honoring the Doolittle Raiders and the Chinese who provided them with assistance in aftermath of the raid is located at the city of Jiangshan in Quzhou, Zhejiang.

Doolittle Raiders re-enactment 

On 21 April 1992, in conjunction with other Department of Defense World War II 50th-Anniversary Commemorative Events, two B-25 Mitchell bombers, B-25J Heavenly Body and B-25J In The Mood, were hoisted aboard . The bombers participated in a commemorative re-enactment of the Doolittle Raid on Tokyo, taking off from Rangers flight deck before more than 1,500 guests. The launch took place off the coast of San Diego. Four B-25s were approved by the US Navy for the reenactment with two selected. The other two participants were B-25J Executive Sweet and B-25J Pacific Princess. Following the launch, eight B-25s flew up the coast where General Doolittle and his son John P. Doolittle watched as each B-25 came in for a low pass, dropping 250 red, white, and blue carnations into the surf, concluding the event.

Congressional Gold Medal 

On 19 May 2014, the United States House of Representatives passed , to award the Doolittle Raiders a Congressional Gold Medal for "outstanding heroism, valor, skill, and service to the United States in conducting the bombings of Tokyo." The award ceremony took place at the Capitol Building on 15 April 2015 with retired Air Force Lieutenant General John Hudson, the Director of the National Museum of the Air Force, accepting the award on behalf of the Doolittle Raiders.

Northrop Grumman B-21 Raider 
In September 2016, the Northrop Grumman B-21 was formally named "Raider" in honor of the Doolittle Raiders. The last surviving Doolittle Raider, retired Lt Col Richard E. Cole, was present at the naming ceremony at the Air Force Association conference.

In popular culture

Books 
Many books have been written about the Doolittle Raid:
 Thirty Seconds Over Tokyo (1943), by Captain Ted W. Lawson – a pilot who participated in the raid, focuses on the experiences of himself and his crew. A popular film based on the book was released in 1944. Written while the war was still in progress, Lawson disguised the identities of the persons in China assisting the raiders and did not publish the story until after the USAAF had released an official communique on 20 April 1943 detailing most aspects of the mission, including the identities of the raiders and their fates.
 Doolittle's Tokyo Raiders, by C. V. Glines (1964) – tells the complete story of the raid, including the unique experiences of each B-25 crew. He followed this with a second account, The Doolittle Raid: America's daring first strike against Japan (1988), incorporating information from first-hand accounts of the Raiders and from Japanese sources.
 Target Tokyo: Jimmy Doolittle and the Raid That Avenged Pearl Harbor, by James M. Scott (2015) – based on scores of never-before-published records drawn from archives across four continents as well as new interviews with survivors.
 Raid of No Return, by Nathan Hale (2017) – a fictionalized account of the raid, presented in graphic novel format for early readers; the book is a part of the Nathan Hale's Hazardous Tales series.

Films 
The raid inspired several films.

A highly fictionalized film in 1943, Destination Tokyo starring Cary Grant, tangentially involved the raid, concentrating on the fictional submarine . The submarine's mission is to enter Tokyo Bay undetected and place a landing party ashore to obtain weather information vital to the upcoming Doolittle raid. The film suggests the raid did not launch until up-to-the-minute data were received. All the after-action reports indicated the raid launched without time for weather briefings because of the encounter with the picket ship.

A 1944 film, The Purple Heart, was a highly fictionalized account of the torture and execution of Doolittle Raid prisoners.

The Doolittle Raid was the subject of another 1944 feature film, Thirty Seconds Over Tokyo, based on the book of the same title by Ted Lawson, who was seriously injured in a crash landing off the coast of China. Spencer Tracy played Doolittle and Van Johnson portrayed Lawson. Footage from the film was later used for the opening scenes of Midway and in the TV miniseries War and Remembrance.

The 2001 film Pearl Harbor (with Alec Baldwin playing Doolittle) presented a heavily fictionalized version of the raid. The film's portrayal of the planning of the raid, the air raid itself, and the raid's aftermath, is not historically accurate.

The VHS video DeShazer including film footage of Doolittle and the flight preparations, along with the B-25s launching, is the story of missionary Sergeant Jake DeShazer of B-25 No. 16 (the last to launch from Hornet). The video is based on The Amazing Story of Sergeant Jacob De Shazer: The Doolittle Raider Who Turned Missionary by C. Hoyt Watson. At the end of both the video and the book, DeShazer after the war meets Mitsuo Fuchida, the commander and lead pilot of the Pearl Harbor attack.

Doolittle's Raiders: A Final Toast, a documentary by Tim Gray and the World War II Foundation, released in 2015, has interviews with the few surviving members of the raid.

The 2018 film The Chinese Widow (aka The Hidden Soldier and In Harm's Way) presented a heavily fictionalized version of the raid with Emile Hirsch playing a fictional Captain Jack Turner who was hidden from the Japanese in China by a Chinese widow and her daughter, after he parachutes from his B-25 near her village. Vincent Riotta played Jimmy Doolittle.

The raid is depicted in the 2019 film Midway, with actor Aaron Eckhart portraying Jimmy Doolittle. Emperor Hirohito is seen being told to go to a shelter during this scene.

Television 
The character of Harry Broderick in the 1979 television series Salvage 1 (played by Andy Griffith), was a fictional veteran of the raid.

Notes

References

Citations

Sources

Further reading

External links 

 Official Doolittle Raiders website Archived
 The Story Of The Doolittle Raid video (2h 54 min.)
 Doolittle Raid. Naval History and Heritage Command
 Children of the Doolittle Raiders website
 Official historian of the Doolittle raid, Carroll V. Glines talks about the raid 
 
 Unsettled History: America, China, and the Doolittle Tokyo Raid – PBS documentary video (57 min.)
 UnsettledHistory.tv – web site about the PBS documentary above.

Airstrikes conducted by the United States
Pacific theatre of World War II
Conflicts in 1942
1942 in Japan
Japan campaign
World War II strategic bombing of Japan
 
World War II raids
April 1942 events